Rae-rae are trans women in Tahitian culture, a contemporary distinction originating in the 1960s from Māhū (meaning "in the middle"), which is the more traditional social category of gender liminal people of Polynesia. Petea is a disparaging term for cis-male homosexuality (suggesting "men who sexually desire each other") used in French Polynesia, in contrast to traditional social category aikane used in Hawaii.

Whereas mahu are regarded as an integral part of Maori tradition, history, and culture, rae-rae are generally less accepted in Tahitian society. They are regarded as the more modern equivalent to drag queens of the western world, and carry a negative connotation with ties to poverty and sex work. Rae-rae may be more likely than mahu to undergo male-to-female gender reassignment surgery or other cosmetic surgeries. Additionally, the identity of rae-rae has closer ties to homosexuality, in contrast to mahu, which identify more with femininity and "sweetness" and may take a vow of chastity. Rae-rae is seen by some as an influence from western (i.e. French) culture, whereas the concept and history of mahu are purely Polynesian and untouched by western ideals. Rae-rae is also a controversial term in Tahiti because it is seen by some as incompatible with two Polynesian cultural ideas: firstly, that one's gender identity is defined before and thus determines one's sexuality; and secondly, that one's gender is constant throughout one's life instead of being fluid. However, some scholars suggest that the objections to rae-rae may be due to Christian influence and morality of sexual modesty.

The idea of a third gender or third sex is common in many cultures. Rae-rae in Tahiti is similar to Kathoey in Thailand, Kothi and Hijra in India, Femminiello in Italy, Muxe in Mexico, and Travesti in South America.

History 
Stories passed down through Tahiti suggest that in the past, it was common for families with multiple children to raise the eldest boy as a girl, as a Mahu. Mahu are much more respected than rae-rae. Rae-rae originated when the French came into Polynesian in the 1960s.

Rae-rae in Hawai'ian culture 
Mahu and rae-rae are generally less favorably regarded in Hawaii as compared to Tahiti due to a more sexually repressive culture. Instead of the distinction being drawn between a traditional, cultural gender identity and a more modern sexual identity, both are more marginalized and outcast from society.

References

Transgender culture
Tahitian culture
Transgender identities
Gender in French Polynesia